Michael (Mike) Manley may refer to:

Michael Manley (1924–1997), fourth Prime Minister of Jamaica
Mike Manley (artist) (born 1961), comic book illustrator and artist
Mike Manley (athlete) (born 1942), Olympic athlete
Mike Manley (lacrosse) (born 1988), lacrosse player
Michael Manley (CEO) (born 1964), CEO of Jeep and FCA